Bryce Poe II (October 10, 1924 – November 20, 2000) was a United States Air Force four-star general who served as  Commander, Air Force Logistics Command (COMAFLC) from 1978 to 1981.

Military career
Poe was born in 1924, in Wichita, Kansas. He attended the Colorado School of Mines, the University of Kansas, and graduated from the United States Military Academy in 1946. He completed Army Air Forces pilot training prior to graduation from the academy. He received a Master of Arts degree in history from the University of Omaha in 1964 and a Master of Science degree in international affairs from The George Washington University, in 1965. He is a graduate of the Armed Forces Staff College in Norfolk, Virginia and the National War College at Fort Lesley J. McNair.

From November 1946 to September 1948, Poe was a member of one of the first jet-equipped units in the U.S. Air Force and flew in more than 80 air shows demonstrating the new aircraft. He then transferred to Japan and was assigned to the 8th Tactical Reconnaissance Squadron, which was equipped with RF-80As.

At the beginning of the Korean War, he transferred to South Korea and flew 90 combat missions including the first U.S. Air Force jet reconnaissance sortie. He returned to the United States and, from January to April 1951, was assigned to a Strategic Air Command fighter escort squadron at Bergstrom Air Force Base, Texas. He then transferred to Shaw Air Force Base, South Carolina, as commander of a reconnaissance replacement training unit.

Poe was assigned to Allied Forces Northern Europe, Oslo, Norway, in August 1952 as a fighter operations officer flying de Havilland Vampires, Gloster Meteors, F-84 Thunderjets and F-86 Sabres with the Royal Norwegian and Royal Danish air forces. He returned to the United States in July 1956 and served as aide and then executive officer to General Bernard Adolph Schriever, commander, Air Force Western Development Division in Inglewood, California.

In August 1959 he entered the Armed Forces Staff College. After graduation in January 1960, he went to Offutt Air Force Base, Nebraska, as operations officer of an Atlas D squadron. In October 1961 he transferred to SAC headquarters as a missile plans officer and later as chief, Missile Plans Section, Operations and Training Division. In August 1964 Poe entered the National War College. Following his graduation in July 1965, he served as chief, Plans Group, Office of Legislative Liaison, Office of the Secretary of the Air Force, Washington, D.C. He transferred to Bergstrom Air Force Base in July 1967 as vice commander of the 75th Tactical Reconnaissance Wing.

He went to Southeast Asia in July 1968 as vice commander, 460th Tactical Reconnaissance Wing, Tan Son Nhut Air Base, Republic of Vietnam. During this tour of duty, he flew 213 combat missions, 200 in RF-4s.

From July 1969 to July 1970, Poe was commander of the 26th Tactical Reconnaissance Wing, Ramstein Air Base, Germany. In July 1970 he assumed duties as deputy chief of staff, logistics, U.S. Air Forces in Europe, Wiesbaden, Germany.

Poe became commander of the Ogden Air Materiel Area (now Ogden Air Logistics Center) at Hill Air Force Base, Utah, in February 1973. In June 1974 he returned to Germany as vice commander in chief of the U.S. Air Forces in Europe at Ramstein Air Base.

He was assigned to Wright-Patterson Air Force Base in July 1976 as commander of the Air Force Acquisition Logistics Division and assumed commander of AFLC in February 1978.

He retired from the Air Force on July 31, 1981, and died of a stroke on November 20, 2000.

Awards and decorations

References

1924 births
2000 deaths
United States Air Force generals
United States Air Force personnel of the Korean War
United States Air Force personnel of the Vietnam War
United States Army Air Forces pilots
American Korean War pilots
American Vietnam War pilots
Recipients of the Air Force Distinguished Service Medal
Recipients of the Legion of Merit
Recipients of the Distinguished Flying Cross (United States)
Recipients of the Air Medal
People from Wichita, Kansas
University of Nebraska Omaha alumni
Elliott School of International Affairs alumni
United States Military Academy alumni